The 2014 Tour of Beijing was the fourth and final running of the Tour of Beijing stage race. It started on 10 October in Hebei's Chongli County and ended on 14 October at the Bird's Nest Piazza after five stages. It was the 29th and final race of the 2014 UCI World Tour season.

At the 2014 UCI Road World Championships in September, cycling's governing body, the Union Cycliste Internationale (UCI), decided that its race-organising subsidiary, Global Cycling Promotion, would not continue to organise the Tour of Beijing; the 2014 edition would be the final edition. UCI President Brian Cookson had criticised the subsidiary body during his election campaign, and the Tour of Beijing was not seen as being well-liked by cyclists. According to Cycling Weekly, "Dull routes and an absence of roadside spectators meant the race failed to exhibit much of an atmosphere, and its position at the very end of the calendar made it even less appealing – a long flight eastwards after a whole season's racing is a very tough sell to exhausted cyclists dreaming of the winter off."

Some issues presented themselves before and during the race. On September 10 it emerged that Valentin Iglinsky of Astana Pro Team had returned a positive test for EPO at the Eneco Tour. He confessed to doping to the team and was immediately sacked, three weeks later Valentin's brother, Maxim Iglinsky was provisionally suspended by the UCI for an EPO positive on August 1. It was later announced that Astana withdrew themselves from the Tour of Beijing in line with the Mouvement pour un cyclisme crédible rules, which state that a team with two positives in a short period of time must not participate in the next World Tour event. There was also the prospect of two Grand Tour winners – Alberto Contador and Alejandro Valverde attending the race with serious winning intentions – with Contador bidding to overhaul his fellow Spaniard Valverde's lead at the top of the overall points standings of the World Tour. However, the combination of Valverde's success and Contador's injury at the Giro di Lombardia, the previous race on the calendar, meant that in the end neither cyclist attended the Tour of Beijing. During the race, Beijing was hit with particularly strong pollution problems, and after complaints from cyclists, stage 2 of the Tour was shortened.

Schedule

Participating teams
As the Tour of Beijing is a UCI World Tour event, all eighteen UCI ProTeams were invited automatically and obligated to send a squad. Because of Astana's self-suspension (see above), only seventeen teams were able to attend. With Astana's absence, Vacansoleil–DCM folding at the end of the previous season, and no wild-card team invited, this represented a big decrease from the 20 teams of the 2013 Tour of Beijing.

The seventeen teams that competed in the race were:

Stages

Stage 1
10 October 2014 — Chong Li to Zhangjiakou,

Stage 2
11 October 2014 — Chong Li to Yanqing,

Stage 3
12 October 2014 — Yanqing to Qianjiandian,

Stage 4
13 October 2014 — Yanqing to Mentougou Miaofeng Mountain,

Stage 5
14 October 2014 — Tiananmen Square to Bird's Nest Piazza,

Classification leadership table

References

External links

2014 UCI World Tour
2014
2014 in Chinese sport
2010s in Beijing
October 2014 sports events in China